The 2nd Colorado Infantry Regiment was an infantry regiment during the American Civil War from the state of Colorado. On October 13, 1863, the 2nd Colorado Infantry was consolidated with the 3rd Colorado Infantry Regiment in order to create the 2nd Colorado Cavalry Regiment.

History

Prior to official formation
On August 29, 1861, James Hobart Ford was authorized by Governor William Gilpin to organize volunteers as a company of infantry. Theodore H. Dodd was appointed command of a second company of volunteers by Governor Gilpin on August 30. Both companies were raised and initially drilled in Cañon City, but by mid-December both companies had marched to Fort Garland in the San Luis Valley.

Redeployment to Ft. Lyon

Consolidation with 3rd Colorado Infantry

See also
List of Colorado Territory Civil War units
Denver City Home Guard

References

Attribution
 

Units and formations of the Union Army from Colorado
Military units and formations established in 1862
1862 establishments in Colorado Territory
Military units and formations disestablished in 1863